Olympic Airlines (Olympiakés Aerogrammés – OA), formerly named Olympic Airways, was the flag carrier airline of Greece.   The airline's head office was located in Athens. The airline operated services to 37 domestic destinations and to 32 destinations world-wide. The airline's main base was at Athens International Airport, "Eleftherios Venizelos", with hubs at Thessaloniki International Airport, "Macedonia", Heraklion International Airport, "Nikos Kazantzakis" and Rhodes International Airport, "Diagoras". Olympic Airlines also owned a base at London Heathrow Airport.  By December 2007, the airline employed about 8,500 staff.

Olympic Airlines was also accredited by IATA with the IOSA (IATA Operational Safety Audit) for their safety practices.

On 6 March 2009, the Greek State announced it had reached an agreement to sell the flight operations, ground handling operations and technical base of the group to Marfin Investment Group, the largest Greek investment fund, thus ending 35 years of state ownership.

On 29 September 2009 Olympic Airlines ceased all operations and most flights. Olympic Air, the new airline formed from privatisation, commenced flights. Olympic Airlines continued to operate some public service flights to Greek islands as well as some flights to destinations outside the European Union (Cairo, Alexandria, Tel Aviv, Beirut, Belgrade) until the Greek State conducted a public tender and redistributed the routes.

On 31 December 2009 Olympic Airlines ceased all operations, as flights to Greek islands have already been allocated and are being flown by other carriers and flights to destinations outside the European Union have been allocated to other carriers who started operating them from 1 January 2010. Until the final closure, Olympic Airlines used the temporary code OP for their flights (instead of OA, which is used by their successor, Olympic Air). All Olympic Airlines flights (using the OP code) since 29 September 2009 and until the final deadline of 31 December 2009, were operated by Olympic Air on a wet lease basis. 

The 31 December 2009 deadline as the final possible date that Olympic Airlines should cease operations, was agreed between the Greek Government and the European Commission as part of the deal to close Olympic Airlines and sell the name and assets to Olympic Air. It was initially expected that operations would end much earlier, but due to the change of government in October 2009 the public tenders for the reallocation of subsidised flights to the Greek islands and for international flight rights outside the European Union were postponed. The company stayed alive until the final deadline of 31 December 2009.

History

Icarus, the first predecessor airline to Olympic, was established in 1930. After just a few months Icarus went bankrupt due to financial problems and limited Greek interest in air transport. Ε.Ε.Ε.Σ. (Ελληνική Εταιρεία Εναέριων Συγκοινωνιών, Greek Company for Air Transport) took its place. At the same time, in 1935, a second airline was created, the privately owned T.A.E. (Τεχνικαί Αεροπορικαί Εκμεταλλεύσεις, Technical and Aeronautical Exploitations). Soon after World War II, in 1947, three airlines were based in Greece: T.A.E., ΕΛΛ.Α.Σ. (Ελληνικαί Αεροπορικαί Συγκοινωνίαι, Greek Air Transport) and Α.Μ.Ε. (Αεροπορικαί Μεταφοραί Ελλάδος, Hellenic Air Transport).

Onassis era

In 1951 the poor financial state of the three airlines led to a decision by the Greek state to merge them into a single operator, TAE Greek National Airlines (TAE). The new airline operated a fleet of twin-engine Douglas DC-3 airliners on domestic Greek routes until the last example was disposed of in May 1970. A four-engine Douglas DC-4 was acquired in 1950 and this was operated on a route to London. The new airline faced financial problems so the government closed it down in 1955.

There were no buyers for the airline so the Greek State bought the company back. In July 1956 the Greek State reached an agreement with Greek shipping magnate Aristotle Onassis for Onassis to purchase the airline. The company flew under the T.A.E. name until the end of the year and for the first few months of 1957. On 6 April 1957 the company was renamed Olympic Airways (Ολυμπιακή Αεροπορία/Olympiaki Aeroporia).

The new company developed rapidly.  To allay the distrust of air transport by Greeks, Onassis developed the "aviation days of '57" scheme, providing short, free flights in a DC-3 to demonstrate the reliability of air travel. Onassis always wanted to be in the cutting edge of the technology, so in 1959 he signed a deal to buy four de Havilland Comet 4B that in 1960 was Olympic's first jet aircraft, that entered service. Olympic and British European Airways created the first codeshare flights; later the companies expanded their cooperation. When Greek crews had to spend a night in London, British crews would fly the Olympic Comets to BEA destinations, and the same with Greek crews and BEA Comets. On all BEA and OA Comets, there would be a "BEA-OLYMPIC" sign. In 1962 Olympic set a record flying a DH Comet 4B from London to Athens in just two hours and 51 minutes.

In 1965 Olympic ordered Boeing 707-320 jets; they received the first, bearing the name "City of Athens", in 1966. Olympic's first Boeing 707 service was also the inauguration of a non-stop route connecting Athens and New York City (JFK). In 1968 Olympic began serving Africa, with a twice-weekly round-trip linking Athens with Nairobi and Johannesburg. The same year OA received the first of a fleet of Boeing 727-200 jet aircraft. A new Athens-Montreal-Chicago service commenced in 1969. Also in 1969, the airline phased out their Comet 4Bs.

Under Onassis' leadership the airline gained a reputation for lavish style. The cabin crews were attired in Pierre Cardin-designed uniforms and passengers ate with golden cutlery and listened to the stylings of a pianist in the first class cabin.

In 1971 OA purchased new NAMC YS-11 twin-turboprop aircraft to replace the ageing non-pressurized Douglas DC-3 and the Douglas DC-6 pressurised piston-engined airliners still in use on the company's Greek domestic network. In that year they created a subsidiary airline, Olympic Aviation/Ολυμπιακή Αεροπλοΐα, to serve the Greek islands more economically and efficiently. To further this strategy, several examples of the small twin-engined turbo-propeller Short Skyvan utility airliner were obtained for operation on routes serving smaller Greek airports. In 1972 Olympic turned to the important Greece-Australia market, beginning Boeing 707-320 operations between Athens and Melbourne twice a week via Bangkok and Singapore.

Olympic then acquired seven Boeing 720-051B aircraft, a medium-range derivative of the Boeing 707, from Northwest Airlines. The airline also entered the wide-body era by purchasing two new Boeing 747-200s. OA even showed interest in the BAC-Aérospatiale Concorde supersonic airliner and, on 5 January 1973, a Concorde landed at Athens' Hellenikon Airport to give a demonstration.

Post-Onassis era

On 23 January 1973, Aristotle Onassis' son, Alexander, died in a plane crash; the event came as a shock to the Greek people and a new phase began for Olympic Airways. A few months later, Onassis sold all of the OA shares to the Greek state and he died shortly afterward (in 1975). In 1976, under state management, OA purchased eleven Boeing 737-200 jet aircraft and created Olympic Catering, which served both OA and foreign airlines. In 1977, in a cost-cutting effort, OA shut down their Australia route, followed by the Canadian one in 1978, when OA also placed orders for four Airbus A300s, plus four options.

In 1984, three more B747-200 aircraft were purchased from Singapore Airlines, and the Canada and Australia routes were reopened. A new Olympic Airways Cargo division was created by converting the Boeing 707-320 "City of Lindos", but the plans were soon abandoned. In 1986, there were strikes at OA, and financial losses mounted.

The company faced serious financial trouble from the 1980s on, mostly because of management problems. Greek politicians and their families traveled for free or token amounts on the airline. Successive Greek governments also made Olympic carry the press at a 97 percent discount. Olympic AirTours (Ολυμπιακή Τουριστική) was created as a subsidiary of OA, which issued tickets not only for OA, but for other airlines as well. Very soon, Olympic AirTours was renamed Macedonian Airlines and reestablished as a charter flight company.

In 1990 a route to Tokyo via Bangkok was launched but Olympic was soon forced to shut it down, despite very high load factors (95%). Olympic purchased seven Boeing 737-400 aircraft in 1991, as well as the advanced version of the A300, the A300-600R. Due to the rising losses and debts, the government decided to formulate a restructuring program in which all debts were erased. This programme, as well as all the plans that followed, failed. A few years later, in an attempt to make OA profitable, management was given to a subsidiary of British Airways, Speedwing. The result was even larger debts and rising losses. In 1999, Olympic purchased four Airbus A340-313X aircraft, to replace the ageing B747-200.

Olympic Airways to Olympic Airlines
By December 2003, the Olympic Airways Group of Companies owned Olympic Airways (Ολυμπιακή Αεροπορία), Olympic Aviation (Ολυμπιακή Αεροπλοϊα), Macedonian Airlines (Mακεδονικές Αερογραμμές), Galileo Hellas (Γαλιλλαίος Ελλάς), Olympic Fuel Company (Ολυμπιακή Εταιρεία Καυσίμων), and Olympic Into-Plane Company. Olympic Catering had been sold a few months earlier. A company formed in the 80s called Olympic AirTours (Ολυμπιακή Τουριστική) had already been transformed into Macedonian Airlines.

Very soon the losses became excessive, so in 2003 the government restructured the Olympic Airways Group of Companies. The subsidiary, Macedonian Airlines S.A., was renamed Olympic Airlines S.A. and took over the flight operations of Olympic Airways, erasing at the same time all of the airline's debts. The remaining group companies, except for Olympic Aviation (Olympic Airways, Olympic Into-Plane Company, Olympic Fuel Company, Olympic Airways Handling and the Olympic Airways Technical Base), merged and formed a new company, called Olympic Airways – Services S.A.. In December 2004, the Greek government decided to privatize Olympic Airlines, but the sale process ended in failure as none of the buyers were eager to repay the Greek state almost 700 million euro in state aid, which was later declared illegal by the European Commission in December 2005.

In 2005, the Greek Government looked for potential buyers to privatise OA. In April of that year, a short list of potential buyers was submitted that included Aegean Airlines, German LCC DBA and a Greek-American consortium called Olympic Investors. Shortly afterwards Aegean Airlines pulled out, followed by DBA. In September 2005, the Greek government signed a non-binding agreement with Olympic Investors to buy the airline. In an interview, Olympic Investors stated that they were backed by York Capital with 6.5 billion dollars and assured that OA's workers would not lose their jobs. They stated that OA should continue to operate as an integrated company and that they were not interested in buying just parts of OA.  By the end of the year, the offer fell through because the huge fine imposed on the airline by the European Commission had not been dealt with.

According to Greek media, the government planned to relaunch the company in late 2006. The code name for the project was Pantheon Airways. In June 2006, Greek media reported that Sabre Aviation Consulting Services was contracted by the Greek government to find investors and develop a business plan for an airline to replace Olympic Airlines, aiming to begin operations in autumn 2006. Under this plan the government would be a minority shareholder of the new carrier, which would be run as a private airline. The planned re-launch date passed without anything happening, and the plan was temporarily frozen.

In 2006 O.A. was thrown a life line, when the courts ordered Greece to repay them almost 564 million euro owed to the airline. The money was owed to O.A. from legally subsidised routes to Greek islands and costs of the relocation to the new airport. The money would be used to pay back part of the State aid declared illegal by the European Commission in December 2005. Olympic Airlines redesigned their website to introduce their e-ticket service, launched on 31 July 2007, in response to the surge of online booking and online check-ins. The e-ticket service introduction by Electronic Data Systems meant Olympic abolished their old "Hermes" booking system, which had served the company for more than two decades. As of November 2007, the e-ticket service is available on all European and International routes, and on 19 of the airline's 37 domestic routes.

On 12 September 2007, the Luxembourg-based EU court ruled that Olympic should repay an amount of money less than what the EU Commission had ordered. This amount included unpaid taxes on fuel and spare parts, as well as unpaid fees to Athens International Airport. The new amount owed by Olympic was €130 million, as compared with the original €160 million. On that same day Olympic Investors, the Greek-American consortium that was interested in buying Olympic in 2005, stated renewed interest in buying the airline.

In November 2007, Irish airline Ryanair filed a suit with the European Commission, saying that they had not looked into their claims that Olympic had not paid back their debt. On 1 December 2007 transport minister Kostas Hatzidakis announced that the entire Olympic Airways Group debts amounted to two billion euro, and that the airline in its present form and size would cease existing in 2008. This was deemed to be the only way for the European Commission to write off the company's debts to the Greek public sector. He stated that Athens was under more pressure to recover the money Olympic owed, because of the Ryanair lawsuit.

Despite all predictions, traffic for Olympic in 2007 increased to a total of 5,977,104 passengers (3,115,521 in domestic and 2,681,583 in international flights) compared to approximately 5,500,000 passengers in 2006. It is estimated that OA earned approximately 780 million euro in 2007, 500 of which came from international flights. However, in 2008 due to lack of aircraft Olympic Airlines cancelled or merged a significant number of flights, about 6,000 according to their union (as of 26 August 2008). Olympic Airlines officials have declared that this is not the major problem since "after all the income reduction is only 4–5 million euros compared to the initial budget plan".

Olympic Airlines to Olympic Air

On 6 March 2009, Development Minister Kostis Hatzidakis announced the sale of the flight operations and the technical base companies to Marfin Investment Group (MIG). As a result, after 35 years of state control and ten years of failed sales attempts, Olympic will once again become a private corporation. The new owners will secure approximately 5000 of the 8500 jobs of the Group.

On 28 September 2009, Olympic Airlines ceased to fly to most of their 69 destinations, maintaining flights to Tel Aviv, Beirut, Cairo and all public service obligation routes within Greece, until the Ministry for Transport and Communications redistributed the routes in late November, when Olympic Airlines entered liquidation. Existing passengers were accommodated on other airlines. Employees of the old company that were in destinations no longer served may have been affected.

The last Olympic Airlines flight was flight 424 from Toronto via Montreal, landing at 11:10 on 29 September 2009 at the Athens International Airport. Olympic Air took over the rest of the operations on 29 September 2009 and their first flight was on 1 October 2009 at 06:20 leaving the Athens International Airport and heading to Thessaloniki Makedonia Airport.

Destinations

Before their demise in 2009, Olympic Airlines flew to 37 domestic and 32 international destinations throughout 23 countries.

Fleet

Final fleet
Olympic Airlines operated the following fleet at the time of closure:

Former fleet
Olympic Airlines has previously operated the following aircraft:

Codeshare agreements
Olympic Airlines had the following codeshare agreements:

 Cyprus Airways connected Athens and Thessaloniki with Larnaca and Athens with Paphos (operated by Cyprus and Olympic)
 Air Malta connected Athens with Malta (operated by Air Malta)
 Czech Airlines connected Athens and Thessaloniki with Prague (operated by Czech CSA)
 Egypt Air connected Athens with Alexandria (operated by Olympic)
 Kuwait Airways connected Athens with Kuwait (operated by Olympic)

Corporate design

Logo
The first logo of the airline was a white eagle, bearing a resemblance to a propeller, featuring five rings and the name Olympic. Just two years after the first flight, Onassis asked his associates to design a new logo and the coloured rings were created. Onassis wanted to copy the five coloured rings of the Olympic emblem, but the International Olympic Committee claimed the rights to the emblem, so a new, six ring logo was introduced. The first five rings stand for the five continents, while the sixth stands for Greece. Colours used were yellow, red, blue and white.

The new logo for Olympic air was selected from among three proposals by an online vote which was open until 5 July 2009 on oalogo.gr. All proposals were expected to keep the six circles and to modernise the existing logo. The logo that was finally selected is a bevel version of the existing logo and font, with the exception that green has replaced the light blue on some circles. Green along with blue is one of MIG's corporate colours (as seen on Marfin Egnatia bank's logo for example) and was thus also used per the request of MIG on the new uniforms too.

Other
 The Olympic name came about as a result of Onassis' passion for ancient Greece. Many of his companies carried the Olympic name such as Olympic Maritime. He followed the same naming pattern for his ships (with names such as "Olympic Legacy", "Olympic Palm", "Olympic Explorer", etc.)
 According to OA regulations, all male flight attendants must wear a black tie, thus paying tribute to the late Alexander Onassis.
 Uniforms for OA flight attendants were created by famous fashion designers. The first uniform was designed by Jean Dessès in 1957, followed by uniforms designed by Coco Chanel (1966), Pierre Cardin (1969), Yiannis Tseklenis (1971), Roula Stathi (1976), Billy Bo (1981), Aspasia Gerel (1987), Makis Tselios (1992) and Artisti Italiani (1998).

Olympic in popular culture
 In the film For Your Eyes Only, James Bond calls Miss Moneypenny to book a ticket with Olympic to Madrid.
 In the film Octopussy, James Bond stands in front of the 'Olympic Airways Building' while watching Kamal Khan leave Sotheby's auction house.
 A sunglass collection by Paul Frank Sunich is called "Olympic Airways".
 "Olympic Airways" is the fourth and last single from the album Antidotes by Foals.

Incidents and accidents

 29 October 1959: a Douglas DC-3 crashed in the locality of Klitys, on mount Parnitha, near Athens, Greece. All 15 passengers and all three crew members perished. It was reported that one of the wings was detached from the plane.
 16 August 1969: a Douglas DC-3 was hijacked on a domestic flight from Ellinikon International Airport, Athens to Agrinion Airport. The four hijackers demanded to be taken to Albania. The aircraft, possibly registered SX-BBF, landed at Valona.
 8 December 1969: Olympic Airways Flight 954 crashed near Keratea, 21 miles southeast of Athens, Greece. All 85 passengers and all five crew members were killed. 
 18 February 1972: an Olympic Aviation Learjet crashed off the coast of Monte Carlo.  Both crew members were killed.
 21 October 1972: a NAMC YS-11 crashed off the coast of Voula, Athens, about 3 miles south of Athens/Hellenicon airport, operating a flight from the island of Corfu (Kerkyra) to Athens, in a thunderstorm. 36 passengers and the co-pilot drowned, while 16 passengers and the remaining three crew members were rescued.
 23 November 1976: Olympic Airways Flight 830 an NAMC YS-11 crashed on mount Metaxas, outside the village of Servia, near Kozani, Greece. All 46 passengers and four crew members perished. One of the plane's wings is still on the site, near a small church built in memory of the victims.
9 August 1978: Olympic Airways Flight 411, a Boeing 747-200 blew an engine upon takeoff from Athens-Ellinikon International Airport heading for New York-JFK (John F. Kennedy International Airport). The plane slowed to a dangerously low speed of 157 knots and was flying dangerously low over downtown Athens. Captain Sifis Migadis managed to gain enough speed and altitude to return the plane to Ellinikon.
 3 August 1989: Olympic Aviation Flight 545, operated by a Shorts 330-200, flew into the cloud-shrouded Mount Kerkis on Samos island killing the 34 people on board.
 12 August 1997: A Boeing 727-230 registered as SX-CBI on Olympic Airways Flight 171, inbound from Athens Ellinikon Airport, touched down late and was steered off the runway to avoid overrunning into the sea. None of the 35 passengers and crew were killed, but the aircraft was damaged beyond repair.
 4 January 1998: a passenger on Olympic Airways Flight 417 died of an allergic reaction to cigarette smoke when a flight attendant, against policy, refused to change his seat. The airline banned all smoking from 15 April 2001. The wife of the deceased, Rubina Husain, won compensation of $1.4 million at a lawsuit before a US court. The US Supreme Court upheld that decision.

Bibliography
 Gradidge, Jennifer, The Douglas DC-1, DC-2, DC-3 – The First Seventy Years, 2006, Air-Britain (Historians) Ltd, .
 Roach, J and Eastwood A.B., Piston Engined Airliner Production List'', 2007, The Aviation Hobby Shop, ISBN none.

References

External links

Olympic Airlines (archive)
Olympic Airways (archive)
actual archived page of Olympic Airlines in 2007 (archive)
Olympic Airways timetables
Olympic Airways Museum

 
Defunct airlines of Greece
Airlines established in 1957
Airlines disestablished in 2009
2009 disestablishments in Greece
Government-owned companies of Greece
Greek companies established in 1957
Aristotle Onassis

pl:Olympic Airlines